Lamellitrochus filosus is a species of sea snail, a marine gastropod mollusk in the family Solariellidae.

Description
The size of the snail's shell attains 3.2 mm.

Distribution
This marine species occurs in the Lesser Antilles off of the island of Antigua.

References

 Quinn, J. F., Jr. 1991. Lamellitrochus, a new genus of Solariellinae (Gastropoda: Trochidae), with descriptions of six new species from the Western Atlantic Ocean. Nautilus 105: 81-91

External links
 To Biodiversity Heritage Library (1 publication)
 To Encyclopedia of Life
 To USNM Invertebrate Zoology Mollusca Collection
 To World Register of Marine Species

filosus
Gastropods described in 1991